Cultural tourism is a type of tourism activity in which the visitor's essential motivation is to learn, discover, experience and consume the tangible and intangible cultural attractions/products in a tourism destination. These attractions/products relate to a set of distinctive material, intellectual, spiritual, and emotional features of a society that encompasses arts and architecture, historical and cultural heritage, culinary heritage, literature, music, creative industries and the living cultures with their lifestyles, value systems, beliefs and traditions.

Overview
Cultural tourism experiences include architectural and archaeological treasures, culinary activities, festivals or events, historic or heritage, sites, monuments and landmarks, museums and exhibitions, national parks and wildlife sanctuaries, religious venues, temples and churches. It includes tourism in urban areas, particularly historic or large cities and their cultural facilities such as theatres. In the twenty-first-century United States, national parks and a limited number of Native American councils continue to promote "tribal tourism." The U.S. National Park Service has publicly endorsed this strain of cultural tourism, despite lingering concerns over exploitation and the potential hazards of ecotourism in Native America.

Proponents of cultural tourism say that it gives the local population the opportunity to benefit financially from their cultural heritage and thus to appreciate and preserve it, while giving visitors the opportunity to broaden their personal horizons. Cultural tourism also has negative sides. There may be negative effects on local residents, such as making the local economy unstable, increasing the cost of living for local residents, increasing pollution or creating environmental problems. The local economy can also be destabilized due to the rapid change in population size. The local population also comes into contact with new ways of life that can disrupt their social fabric.

This form of tourism is also becoming generally more popular throughout the world, and a recent OECD report has highlighted the role that cultural tourism can play in regional development in different world regions. Cultural tourism has been also defined as 'the movement of persons to cultural attractions away from their normal place of residence, with the intention to gather new information and experiences to satisfy their cultural needs'. Nowadays, cultural tourism has recently shifted in the nature of demand with a growing desire for cultural "experiences" in particular. Additionally, cultural and heritage tourism experiences appear to be a potentially key component of memorable tourism experiences.

Destinations

One type of cultural tourism destination is living cultural areas. Visiting any culture other than one's own such as traveling to a foreign country. Other destinations include historical sites, modern urban districts, "ethnic pockets" of town, fairs/festivals, theme parks, and natural ecosystems. It has been shown that cultural attractions and events are particularly strong magnets for tourism. In light of this, many cultural districts add visitor services to key cultural areas to bolster tourist activity. The term cultural tourism is used for journeys that include visits to cultural resources, regardless of whether it is tangible or intangible cultural resources, and regardless of the primary motivation. In order to understand properly the concept of cultural tourism, it is necessary to know the definitions of a number terms such as, for example, culture, tourism, cultural economy, cultural and tourism potentials, cultural and tourist offer, and others.

Creative tourism
Creative tourism is a new type of tourism, recently theorized and defined by Greg Richards and Crispin Raymond in 2000. They defined creative tourism as: “Tourism which offers visitors the opportunity to develop their creative potential through active participation in courses and learning experiences, which are characteristic of the holiday destination where they are taken." (Richards, Greg et Raymond, Crispin, 2000). Creative Tourism involves active participation from tourists in cultural experiences specific to each holiday destination.

This type of tourism is opposed to mass tourism and allows the destinations to diversify and offer innovative activities different from other destinations.

Similarly, UNESCO launched in 2004 a program entitled Creative Cities Network. This network aims to highlight cities around the world that are putting creativity at the heart of their sustainable urban development plan. Creative cities are organized into seven categories representing seven different creative fields: crafts and folk arts, digital arts, film, design, gastronomy, literature, and music. As of January 2020, the network has 246 members across all categories.
In order to promote the development of this new type of tourism, a non-profit organization was created in Barcelona in 2010: Creative Tourism Network. Its missions involve, among others: the promotion of creative tourism, the creation of a network of “Creativefriendly” cities but also awards celebration, The Creative Tourism Awards.

See also

 Archaeological tourism
 Cultural diplomacy 
 Cultural tourism in Egypt
 Film tourism
 Impacts of tourism
 Literary tourism
 Overtourism
 Tourist trap

References

Further reading
 Bob McKercher and Hilary du Cros, Cultural Tourism: The partnership between tourism and cultural heritage management, Routledge, 2002.
 Greg Richards, Cultural Tourism: Global and local perspectives, Routledge, 2007.
 Priscilla Boniface, Managing Quality Cultural Tourism, Routledge, 1995.
 Milena Ivanovic, Cultural Tourism, Juta and Company Ltd, 2009.

External links

Family Heritage Tourism
Cultural Heritage Tourism
GoUNESCO – Culture and Heritage Travel Challenge
Heritage Tourism from the National Trust
Success factors for museums & non-profit cultural attractions
Sri Lanka Cultural Tour Package

 
Adventure travel
Types of tourism